Curtis Adams may refer to:

 Curtis Adams (magician) (born 1982), American magician
 Curtis Adams (American football) (born 1962), former American football player

See also
Kurt Adams (disambiguation)